Stage Mother is a 1933 American pre-Code drama film directed by Charles Brabin and starring Alice Brady and Maureen O'Sullivan. The film is about a frustrated vaudeville performer who pushes her daughter into becoming a star dancer; selfishness, deceit and blackmail drive mother and daughter apart until a reconciliation at the end of the film. The screenplay was written by John Meehan, based on the 1933 novel Stage Mother by Bradford Ropes.

Plot
Four years after her vaudevillian husband's death, Kitty Lorraine, a frustrated former performer, marries comic Ralph Martin and returns to the stage, leaving behind her four-year-old daughter Shirley with her former in-laws. Fed up after ten years of Ralph's drinking, Kitty divorces him and sends for her now 14-year-old daughter. Two years of training allows Shirley to land a featured role in a touring music revue. Upon Shirley's return to New York City, Kitty blackmails the revue's manager into breaking Shirley's contract so she can take the starring role in a Broadway revue.

During tryouts in Boston, Shirley returns to her family home and meets Warren Foster, an artist now living there. She takes advantage of her mother's sudden illness to continue seeing Warren, eventually staying the night with him. When Kitty intercepts a love letter from Warren to Shirley, she blackmails Warren's parents for $10,000. Warren angrily denounces Shirley.

Shirley next takes up with Al Dexter, a candidate for mayor. When his political operatives get wind of the relationship they pay Kitty $25,000 to sail with Shirley to Europe. On board ship, Shirley meets Lord Reggie Aylesworth. Worried that the class-conscious Reggie will abandon her, Shirley denies that Kitty is her mother, claiming she is merely a stage mother. Reggie proposes and Shirley accepts, blithely informing Kitty both of the lie and that she will not be welcomed in her new home. A contrite Kitty hands over another intercepted love letter from Warren and gives Shirley her blessing for a happy life.

Cast

Production
Stage Mother was based on the novel of the same name by Bradford Ropes, whose earlier book 42nd Street had been adapted into the successful 1933 film.

The film includes the songs "Beautiful Girl" and "I'm Dancing on a Rainbow" with words and music by Nacio Herb Brown and Arthur Freed, and "Any Little Girl, That's a Nice Little Girl, Is the Right Little Girl for Me" with words and music by Fred Fisher.

Reception
Mordaunt Hall for The New York Times finds many of the film's scenarios "utterly implausible" but praises Brady for making them somewhat believable. He credits Brady's acting and Brabin's direction with making Stage Mother "infinitely more acceptable than most others of its type".

Film historian Richard Barrios identified Stage Mother as an example of the presentation of "coded" homosexual imagery in early film. The Motion Picture Production Code banned overt portrayals of homosexuality but the Code was laxly enforced until July 1, 1934, when Joseph Breen took over. The character of Mr. Sterling, Shirley's dance instructor, typifies the motion picture homosexual. Posing with hands on hips, Sterling lisps his way through his scene with Kitty and Shirley and even exchanges dialogue with Kitty implying that she will fix him up with other men in the theatre.

Notes

References
 Barrios, Richard (2003). Screened Out: Playing Gay in Hollywood from Edison to Stonewall. Psychology Press. .

External links
 Stage Mother at the Internet Movie Database
 

1933 films
American LGBT-related films
American musical drama films
Films based on American novels
Films directed by Charles Brabin
Metro-Goldwyn-Mayer films
LGBT-related musical drama films
American black-and-white films
1930s musical drama films
1930s LGBT-related films
1933 drama films
1930s American films